The cycling competitions of the 2019 European Games in Minsk were held at two venues, twenty-four events between 22 June and 30 June.

The venues were Minsk city centre for the road cycling road race and Minsk Arena Velodrome for the track cycling events.

Cycling competitions have been contested in both of the European Games since the first in 2015.

Venues

Qualification

Participation

Participating nations

Medal table

Medal summary

Road cycling

Track cycling

Men

Women

References

External links
Cycling − Track − Results book

 
Sports at the 2019 European Games
2019
European Games
Cycle races in Belarus
European Games
European Games